Solute carrier family 23 member 1 is a protein that in humans is encoded by the SLC23A1 gene.

Function 

The absorption of vitamin C into the body and its distribution to organs requires two sodium-dependent vitamin C transporters. This gene encodes one of the two required transporters. The encoded protein is active in bulk vitamin C transport involving epithelial surfaces. Previously, this gene had an official symbol of SLC23A2.

See also 
 Solute carrier family

References

Further reading 

 
 
 
 
 
 
 
 
 
 
 
 
 

Solute carrier family